Richard Knight may refer to:

Richard Knight (MP) (by 1518–1555 or later), English MP for Chichester
Sir Richard Knight (1639–1679) , English MP for Lymington
Richard Knight (footballer) (born 1979), English footballer
Richard Knight (1659–1745), of Downton, Herefordshire, ironmaster
Richard Payne Knight (1750–1824), MP, classical scholar, connoisseur, archaeologist and numismatist
Richard of the Knight Brothers, a soul music duo
Richard Knight (cricketer) (1892–1960), English cricketer
Richard Knight (rower) (born 1928), British Olympic rower
Richard Knight (art dealer), former Director of Colnaghi and Christie's
Richard Knight (speedway rider) (born 1959), former motorcycle speedway rider

See also
Dick Knight (disambiguation)